The washboard and frottoir (from Cajun French "frotter", to rub) are used as a percussion instrument, employing the ribbed metal surface of the cleaning device as a rhythm instrument. As traditionally used in jazz, zydeco, skiffle, jug band, and old-time music, the washboard remained in its wooden frame and is played primarily by tapping, but also scraping the washboard with thimbles. Often the washboard has additional traps, such as a wood block, a cowbell, and even small cymbals. Conversely, the frottoir (zydeco rubboard) dispenses with the frame and consists simply of the metal ribbing hung around the neck. It is played primarily with spoon handles or bottle openers in a combination of strumming, scratching, tapping and rolling.  The frottoir or vest frottoir is played as a stroked percussion instrument, often in a band with a drummer, while the washboard generally is a replacement for drums. In Zydeco bands, the frottoir is usually played with bottle openers, to make a louder sound. It tends to play counter-rhythms to the drummer. In a jug band, the washboard can also be stroked with a single whisk broom and functions as the drums for the band, playing only on the back-beat for most songs, a substitute for a snare drum. In a four-beat measure, the washboard will stroke on the 2-beat and the 4-beat. Its best sound is achieved using a single steel-wire snare-brush or whisk broom.  However, in a jazz setting, the washboard can also be played with thimbles on all fingers, tapping out much more complex rhythms, as in The Washboard Rhythm Kings, a full-sized band, and Newman Taylor Baker.

There are three general ways of deploying the washboard for use as an instrument. The first, mainly used by American players like Washboard Chaz of the Washboard Chaz Blues Trio and Ralf Reynolds of the Reynolds Brothers Rhythm Rascals, is to drape it vertically down the chest. The second, used by European players like David Langlois of the Blue Vipers of Brooklyn, Ben Turner of Piedmont Bluz, and Stephane Seva of Paris Washboard, is to hold it horizontally across the lap, or, for more complex setups, to mount it horizontally on a purpose-built stand. The third (and least common) method, used by Washboard Sam, Súle Greg Wilson of the Carolina Chocolate Drops and Sankofa Strings, and Deryck Guyler, is to hold it in a perpendicular orientation between the legs while seated, so that both sides of the board might be played at the same time.

There is a Polish traditional jazz festival and music award named "Złota Tarka" (Golden Washboard).  Washboards, called "zatulas", are also occasionally used in Ukrainian folk music.

History
The washboard as a percussion instrument ultimately derives from the practice of hamboning as practiced in West Africa and brought to the new world by enslaved Africans.   This led to the development of Jug bands which used jugs, spoons, and washboards to provide the rhythm.  Jug bands became popular in the 1920s. Washboard Doc, Washboard Willie, and Washboard Sam were famous players.

The frottoir, also called a Zydeco rub-board, is a mid-20th century invention designed specifically for Zydeco music.  It is one of the few musical instruments invented entirely in the United States and represents a distillation of the washboard into essential elements (percussive surface with shoulder straps).  It was designed in 1946 by Clifton Chenier and fashioned by Willie Landry, a friend and metalworker at the Texaco refinery in Port Arthur, Texas. Clifton's brother Cleveland Chenier famously played this newly designed rubboard using bottle openers. Likewise, Willie's son, Tee Don Landry, continues the traditional hand manufacturing of rubboards in his small shop in Sunset, Louisiana, between Lafayette and Opelousas.

In 2010 Saint Blues Guitar Workshop launched an electric washboard percussion instrument called the Woogie Board.

Notable players

In British Columbia, Canada, Tony McBride, known as "Mad Fingers McBride", performs with a group called The Genuine Jug Band. Tony is referred to as "The Canadian Washboard King". His percussion set-up was created by Douglas Fraser, of the same band. The washboard set-up was seen in Modern Drummer magazine, August 2014 edition. Also from Canada, Washboard Hank toured with Fred Eaglesmith.

Musician Steve Katz famously played washboard with the Even Dozen Jug Band.  His playing can be heard on the group's legendary self-titled Elektra recording from 1964. Katz reprised his washboard playing on Played a Little Fiddle, a 2007 recording featuring Steve Katz, Stefan Grossman and Danny Kalb. Katz's washboard approach is notable as he plays the instrument horizontally. Additionally, Katz uses fingerpicks instead of thimbles.

In Belgium, Luc Brughmans uses it in te "La planche à jazz" plays horizontally, with attachment to à snare harness.

In their earliest incarnations as The Quarrymen, The Beatles were a skiffle band, featuring Pete Shotton on washboard.

During their early years, Mungo Jerry frequently featured washboard on stage and on record, played by Joe Rush.

Jim "Dandy" Mangrum, lead singer of Southern rock band Black Oak Arkansas, is well known for incorporating the washboard into many of the band's songs, notably "When Electricity Came to Arkansas".  Self-taught Elizabeth Bougerol has made the washboard a key element of The Hot Sardines jazz band.

Cody Dickinson, a member of hill country blues bands the North Mississippi Allstars and Country Hill Revue plays an electrified washboard on a self-written track, "Psychedelic Sex Machine". The song is almost entirely centered around the sound of the washboard, captured by a small clip-on microphone. The sound is then sent through a wah-wah and other effects pedals to create a fresher, more innovative and up-to-date sound for the washboard. A frottoir is played with a stroking instrument (usually with spoon handles or a pair of bottle-openers) in each hand. In a 4-beat measure, the frottoir will be stroked 8 to 16 times. It plays more like a Latin percussion instrument, rather than as a drum. The rhythms used are often similar to those played on Guiro.

Robin Rapuzzi is the washboard player for New Orleans old-time jazz band Tuba Skinny.

English actor Deryck Guyler was well known for his washboard-playing skills.

At least one player has twice appeared at Carnegie Hall.

In media 
Bender, a fictional robot from Futurama, a science fiction animated sitcom, becomes a washboard player in Bendin' in the Wind (Series 3: Episode 13), performing alongside real life musician and guest star Beck.

Further reading
 Chronology of the Washboard in Music, by Chuck Wilson

References

External links
 Cajun Musical Instruments Illustrations
 

Scraped idiophones
Cajun musical instruments
American musical instruments
Improvised musical instruments
Articles containing video clips